Brookland Wood is a  biological Site of Special Scientific Interest east of Tunbridge Wells in Kent.

This site has diverse types of woodland and ground flora. Alder is dominant in wet areas and hazel, ash and field maple in drier ones. Small streams have a variety of mosses and liverworts.

A public footpath goes through the wood.

References

Sites of Special Scientific Interest in Kent
Forests and woodlands of Kent